Rubén Suárez Estrada (born 19 February 1979) is a Spanish former footballer. Mainly an attacking midfielder, he could also play as a second striker.

He appeared in 283 Segunda División matches over 13 seasons, totalling 49 goals for Sporting de Gijón, Elche, Levante and Almería. He added 61 games and 13 goals in La Liga with the two last clubs, and also competed professionally in China and Greece.

Club career
Born in Gijón, and a product of local Sporting de Gijón's famed youth academy, Mareo, Suárez played six seasons with the Asturians' first team in the Segunda División. He stayed in that league afterwards, with four additional years at Elche CF.

Suárez joined Levante UD in the same division on 31 July 2008, on a two-year contract. In his first year he finished as the side's top scorer at 12, mainly due to the serious fibula injury to Alexandre Geijo.

In the 2009–10 season, Suárez repeated the feat (again netting in double digits), as the Valencians returned to La Liga after a two-year absence. On 28 August 2010, at the age of 31 years, six months and nine days, he made his debut in the top division, opening the score at home against Sevilla FC through a penalty kick, in an eventual 4–1 defeat.

In late June 2012, aged 33, Suárez had his first adventure abroad, signing with Chinese Super League club Guizhou Renhe F.C. and reuniting with former Levante teammates Rafa Jordà and Nano, after contributing eight goals in less than 1,000 minutes of play to Levante's first-ever qualification for the UEFA Europa League after a sixth-place finish in the league.

Suárez returned to his country on 3 January 2013, signing with second-tier UD Almería for 18 months.

International career
Suárez played all the matches for Spain at the 1999 FIFA World Youth Championship held in Nigeria, scoring in a 3–1 group stage win against Honduras – the only game where he did not appear from the bench – as the national team won the tournament. Later that year, he earned one cap for the under-21s.

Personal life
Suárez's father, Secundino, was also a footballer. A defender, he too played for Sporting Gijón.

Honours
Spain U20
FIFA World Youth Championship: 1999

References

External links

1979 births
Living people
Spanish footballers
Footballers from Gijón
Association football midfielders
La Liga players
Segunda División players
Segunda División B players
Tercera División players
Divisiones Regionales de Fútbol players
Sporting de Gijón B players
Sporting de Gijón players
Elche CF players
Levante UD footballers
UD Almería players
CD Castellón footballers
CD Torrevieja players
CF Torre Levante players
Chinese Super League players
Beijing Renhe F.C. players
Super League Greece players
Xanthi F.C. players
Spain youth international footballers
Spain under-21 international footballers
Spanish expatriate footballers
Expatriate footballers in China
Expatriate footballers in Greece
Spanish expatriate sportspeople in China
Spanish expatriate sportspeople in Greece